The Dublin Metropolitan Police (DMP) was the police force of Dublin, Ireland, from 1836 to 1925, when it was amalgamated into the new Garda Síochána.

History

19th century
The Dublin city police had been subject to major reforms in 1786 and 1808. Organised rural policing in Ireland began when Robert Peel, then Chief Secretary for Ireland, created the Peace Preservation Force in 1814. This rudimentary paramilitary police force was designed to provide policing in rural Ireland, replacing the 18th century system of watchmen, baronial constables, revenue officers and British military forces. Peel went on to found the London Metropolitan Police.

In 1822, a new Act created four improved "County" Constabularies, whose organisation was based around the traditional provinces of Ireland.

1836: reform
In 1836, the county constabularies were merged into a new centralised Constabulary of Ireland, and the Peace Preservation Force ceased to exist. At the same time separate non-paramilitary forces were set up in the largest cities: Dublin, Belfast, and Derry. A perceived lack of impartiality following rioting in the municipal police forces of Belfast and Derry saw both forces absorbed by the national force in 1865 and 1870 respectively, and only Dublin maintained its separate force. The DMP was established under the Dublin Police Act 1836 as an unarmed, uniformed force of one thousand day and night constables. The Castle-controlled organisation was more accountable than the untrained constables and night watchmen it replaced.

The 1836 Act authorised the "chief governor of Ireland" to establish a police office in Dublin, supported by two salaried justices, to administer the police force which would be under the direction of the Chief Secretary for Ireland. It also provided for the recruitment and appointment of policemen and the regulation of their conduct. It also created powers of arrest and made arrangements for the financial affairs of the new force, including new taxation.

The DMP was modelled closely on London's Metropolitan Police. Not only were the uniforms of the two forces almost indistinguishable, especially after the helmet and Bath Star were adopted, but the two forces also had a similar organisational structure; rather than a Chief Constable, they were commanded by a Commissioner, who was not a police officer, but a magistrate holding a Commission of the Peace. The first Commissioner of the Dublin Metropolitan Police was John Lewis More O'Ferrall, brother of Richard More O'Ferrall. This was descended from the 18th century system of controlling parish constables, and was a sop to the public's fears about the danger of a standing police force under government control.

1880s: Land War
The force came under considerable pressure in the 1880s during the Land War, in which 500 policemen were injured. A series of protest meetings were held and strikes were threatened in 1882.

20th century

1913–14: Dublin Lock-out
Two men died and several hundred people were injured over the course of the five-month Dublin Lock-out, including two hundred policemen. Although the police were involved in "frequent collisions" with union members and used tactics such as baton charges against them, a vice-regal commission cleared them of wrongdoing after the events – though their reputation had suffered considerably.

1916 onwards
As an unarmed urban force, the Dublin Metropolitan Police did not participate as actively in the War of Independence as did the RIC, and as such did not suffer the casualty rate of that force, although three men were killed and seven injured. One of their number David Neligan (who was an IRA agent) records in his book "The Spy in the Castle" that the majority of the DMP uniformed personnel observed a neutral role, restricted to traditional policing functions. The political "G" Division did not come off so lightly, and selected "G men" were first given warnings by the Irish Republican Army in April 1919. Five members of "G" Division were subsequently killed by the IRA, the first in July 1919. Several DMP officers actively assisted the IRA, most notably Edward Broy, who passed valuable intelligence to Michael Collins throughout the conflict.

In the 1996 film Michael Collins, Broy is discovered and subsequently tortured and killed by the British. His fate in the film is based on that of Dick McKee, who, with Peadar Clancy and the civilian Conor Clune, was murdered after torture in Dublin Castle on "Bloody Sunday", 21 November 1920.

Its last Commissioner was W.R.E. Murphy. "Dublin Metropolitan" is today a geographic region of the 's command structure.

Unlike the RIC, but in common with police forces in Great Britain, the DMP was an unarmed force.

Ranks

References

External links
 DMP Roll of Honour in the British National Police Officers Roll of Honour (since this only covers UK forces, the DMP pages only cover up to 1922)
 Article about DMP on occasion of centenary of 1913 Lockout
 A History of the Dublin Metropolitan Police and Its Colonial Legacy
 Dublin Metropolitan Police (DMP) Prisoners Books 1905-1918. A UCD Digital Library Collection.
 DMP Annual Reports 1875 to 1912 Garda Síochána website

 
1836 establishments in Ireland
Defunct law enforcement agencies of Ireland
Defunct police forces of the United Kingdom
History of Dublin (city)
Garda Síochána units